Aramaio is a town and municipality located in the province of Álava, in the Basque Country, northern Spain.

Elizate 
 Arexola, elizate
 Azkoaga, elizate
 Barajuen, elizate
 Etxaguen, elizate
 Gantzaga, elizate
 Ibarra, capital and main population of the municipality including the following hamlets: Arraga, Eguzkierripa, Errotabarri et Salgo
 Oleta, elizate and concejo
 Untzilla, elizate
 Uribarri, elizate

Geography

Mountains
Orisol

References

External links
 ARAMAYONA in the Bernardo Estornés Lasa - Auñamendi Encyclopedia Information available in Spanish

Municipalities in Álava